Altınkum is a seaside resort in western Turkey, 123 km from Aydın. 
It is on the Aegean Sea, near the ancient Temple of Apollo and the ruins of the Ionian city of Didyma (Didim).

Location 

Altinkum and Didim are located in Aydın Province between the city of İzmir and the resort Bodrum, about a 90-minute car ride either direction. Nearest airports: Bodrum Milas Airport and Izmir Adnan Menderes Airport.

The Greek holiday island Kos is an hour's boat ride away and Samos, Rhodes and Kusadasi are also in range. The region has developed from a string of small rural fishing villages into a tourist area. Altınkum and Didim were formerly two separate towns, but have grown together with a combined population of approximately 35,000 permanent residents, including about 5000 foreigners, mostly British with some Germans.

Altinkum, or “golden sands”, or "little Britain" is the beach and promenade area within the town of Didim. Visitors are predominantly Turkish or British but over recent years tourists from countries such as Hungary, Bulgaria and Romania have been visiting in increasing numbers, mostly families and the older generation. Set on a sandy bay, the resort is relaxed and informal. There are three beaches within easy reach, and all have been awarded the Blue Flag Award. With 55 km (34 miles) of coastline in the immediate area, there are many beaches to explore, including eleven that have been awarded a Blue Flag classification.

The Main (or First) beach in front of the resort is a long wide stretch of sand with sunbathing and water sports. Sun beds and umbrellas are available for rent. Boat trips that tour the nearby coastline depart from the main harbour, serving lunch and afternoon tea on board. Along the length of the beach are cafes, bars and restaurants.

The Second beach area is just to the east of Main beach and Third Beach is to the west. Just beyond Third beach is Didim marina, currently one of the largest in Turkey which opened in September 2009 and has space for 1200 boats. There are café bars and restaurants within the marina.

History 

Altınkum and Didim (previously  Didyma  or  Yenihisar) is surrounded by a number of ancient sites, most notably, the Apollo Temple, located on the outskirts of Didim. The main temple was built in the 8th century B.C., was surrounded by columns at the beginning of the 6th century B.C. and completed around 550 B.C.

Miletos and Ephesus is a short drive away, and also Meryemana - said to be the Virgin Mary's last home. Many pilgrims visit this place every year.

Didim was originally referred to as Didyma and, next to Delphi, was the most renowned oracle centre of the Hellenic world, first mentioned among the Greeks in the Homeric Hymn to Apollo but preceding literacy and even the colonization of Ionia.

Didyma was originally home to a pre-Greek religious group of nomads that grew up around a sacred wood and holy spring. This natural spring was the place where Leto conceived and gave birth to the twins Artemis and Apollo who were fathered by Zeus.

According to some sources, "Didyma" translates as "twin". It refers to the twin God and Goddess, Apollo and Artemis, who were born here.

On the grounds of the Apollo Temple is a stone head of the gargoyle Medusa.

A road leading to a small harbour was lined with ancient statues, but they were taken to the British Museum in 1858.

Modern Didim 

Around the mid-1980s, the people from large cities around Turkey such as Istanbul, Ankara and Izmir came to Didim and built  summer houses and holiday homes. When Turkey's economy started to decline, these people found it hard to survive in the big cities and many of the owners, the majority of whom were retired, decided to relocate to Didim permanently.

Didim is a rapidly growing town, visited by large numbers of Turkish and European tourists every year, with its own marina and beach festival.

References 

Beaches of Turkey
Populated places in Aydın Province
Seaside resorts in Turkey
Towns in Turkey
Landforms of Aydın Province
Altinkum News